Arkansas Highway 220 is a designation for two state highways in west Arkansas. The southern segment of  runs from Oklahoma State Highway 101 near Uniontown to AR 59. A northern segment of  runs from AR 59 north to AR 170 in Devil's Den State Park. The route is not paved within Devil's Den State Park, and was the only Arkansas state highway that remains unpaved until a January 2016 announcement that paving would begin. As of summer 2018, the entire route is now fully paved.

Route description
AR 220 begins at SH 101 at the Oklahoma state line and runs as the Uniontown Highway to meet AR 59 south of Cedarville.

Major intersections

Southern segment

Northern segment

See also

References

External links

220
Transportation in Crawford County, Arkansas
Transportation in Washington County, Arkansas